Donald John Arnold (July 14, 1935 – June 27, 2021) was a Canadian competition rower and Olympic champion. He was born in Kelowna, British Columbia.

He received a gold medal in coxless fours at the 1956 Summer Olympics in Melbourne, together with Archibald MacKinnon, Lorne Loomer and Walter D'Hondt.

At the 1958 British Empire and Commonwealth Games Arnold received a gold medal in eights, and a silver medal in coxed fours. He received a silver medal in eights at the 1960 Summer Olympics in Rome, as a member of the Canadian team. He died in North Vancouver, British Columbia at the age of 85 from heart failure in 2021.

Awards
Arnold was inducted into the Canadian Olympic Hall of Fame in 1958. He was inducted into British Columbia Sports Hall of Fame in 1966, and into University of British Columbia Sports Hall of Fame in 1993, together with the other members of the Olympic gold team.

References

External links
sports-reference
 

1935 births
2021 deaths
Commonwealth Games gold medallists for Canada
Commonwealth Games silver medallists for Canada
Medalists at the 1956 Summer Olympics
Medalists at the 1960 Summer Olympics
Olympic gold medalists for Canada
Olympic medalists in rowing
Olympic rowers of Canada
Olympic silver medalists for Canada
Rowers at the 1958 British Empire and Commonwealth Games
Rowers at the 1956 Summer Olympics
Rowers at the 1960 Summer Olympics
Sportspeople from Kelowna
Commonwealth Games medallists in rowing
20th-century Canadian people
21st-century Canadian people
Medallists at the 1958 British Empire and Commonwealth Games